"Melanie Makes Me Smile" is a 1970 song written by Barry Mason and Tony Macaulay.  It became a top 10 hit in Australia in early 1970 by the Strangers.

Cover versions
 The song became a minor hit in the U.S. (#87) and Canada when covered by Tony Burrows, his only U.S. chart hit under his own name (Burrows had numerous bigger hits as lead vocalist for various session groups).
 Former First Edition singer Terry Williams covered "Melanie Makes Me Smile" in 1972.  It was released as a single and reached the top 10 on the Canadian Adult Contemporary chart during the winter of 1973. It also charted minorly in the U.S.

Chart history

Weekly charts
The Strangers

Tony Burrows cover

Terry Williams cover

Year-end charts

References

External links
 Lyrics of this song
  (The Strangers)
  (Tony Burrows & the Hit Squad)

1969 songs
1969 singles
1970 singles
1972 singles
Tony Burrows songs
Songs written by Barry Mason
Songs written by Tony Macaulay
Bell Records singles
MGM Records singles